CFNR may refer to:

 CFNR-FM, a radio station (92.1 FM) licensed to Terrace, British Columbia, Canada
 California Northern Railroad (reporting mark CFNR)
 University of the Philippines Los Baños College of Forestry and Natural Resources